The international ballroom version of samba is a lively, rhythmical dance with elements from Brazilian samba. It differs considerably from the original samba styles of Brazil; in particular, it differs from Samba de Gafieira, a partner type of Samba in that country.

Technique
As a ballroom dance, the samba is a partner dance. Ballroom samba, even more than other ballroom dances, is very disconnected from the origins and evolution of the music and dance that gives it its name.

Most steps are danced with a slight downward bouncing or dropping action. This action is created through the bending and straightening of the knees, with bending occurring on the beats of 1 and 2, and the straightening occurring between. However, unlike the bouncing of, e.g., Polka, there is no considerable bobbing. Also, Samba has a specific hip action, different from that in other ballroom Latin dances (Rumba and Cha-Cha-Cha).

It uses several different rhythmic patterns in its figures, with cross-rhythms being a common feature. Thus, for three-step patterns, common step values (in beats) are:

Music
The ballroom samba is danced under several different rhythms, including the original samba music. It is also possible to dance ballroom samba with flamenco, zouk,  and other South American rhythms.

References 

Latin dances
Ballroom dance
Samba